Malvina is a feminine given name derived from the Scottish Gaelic Mala-mhìn, meaning "smooth brow". It was popularized by the 18th century Scottish poet James Macpherson. Other names popularised by Macpherson became popular in Scandinavia on account of Napoleon, an admirer of Macpherson's Ossianic poetry, who was the godfather of several children of Jean Baptiste Jules Bernadotte, an officer of his who ruled Norway and Sweden in the early 19th century.

The Argentinian name for the Falkland Islands, Las Malvinas, is not etymologically related to Malvina, but is instead derived from the name of St Malo, a seaport in Brittany.

Literary characters 
Malvina is the bride or lover of Oscar in the Ossian cycle of James Macpherson.
Thomas Campbell's poem Lord Ullin's Daughter was translated into the Russian language by the Romantic poet Vasiliy Zhukovsky. In Zhukovsky's translation, the title character, who is left unnamed in Campbell's original, is given the name Malvina, which the Russian poet likely borrowed from James Macpherson's Ossian. Vladimir Nabokov has translated Zhukovsky's translation into English to demonstrate the changes that were made.

People
Malvina Bolus (1906–1997), Canadian historian, art collector, editor of the Hudson's Bay Company magazine "The Beaver"
Malvina Garrigues (Schnorr von Carolsfeld) (1825–1904), Danish-German operatic soprano
Malvina Hoffman (1887–1966), American sculptor
Malvina Longfellow (1889–1962), American stage and silent movie actress
Malvina Major (born 1943), New Zealand singer
Malvina Pastorino (1916-1994), Argentine film actress
Malvina Reynolds (1900–1978), American folk/blues singer-songwriter and political activist
Malvina Shanklin Harlan (1839–1916), American wife of a U.S. Supreme Court Justice, grandmother of another U.S. Supreme Court Justice, and author of a 1915 memoir
Malvina Bovi Van Overberghe (1900–1983), Belgian operatic soprano known as Vina Bovy
Malvina Evalyn Wood (1893–1976), Australian university librarian and college warden

Fictional characters
Malvina, the girl with blue hair – a doll-heroine from Aleksey Tolstoy's 1936 book The Golden Key, or the Adventures of Buratino

References

English given names invented by fiction writers
English-language feminine given names
Feminine given names
Scottish feminine given names